Jack Pinto may refer to:

 Jack Pinto, American radio personality at WFJS (AM)
 Jack Pinto, American singer, 2011 International Quartet Championship as member of Old School (quartet)
 Jack Pinto (2006–2012), victim in the Sandy Hook Elementary School shooting

Fiction

 Jack Pinto, character in the 2000 Bollywood film Paagalpan

See also 

 John Pinto (disambiguation)
 Pinto (disambiguation)